Hate is a comic book by writer-artist Peter Bagge.  First published by Fantagraphics in 1990 it ran for 30 issues, and was one of the best-selling alternative comics of the 1990s, at its height selling 30,000 copies an issue.  In 2000 Bagge revived the series in Hate Annual, a yearly comic that continues the story after Hate in short stories, and includes writings on libertarianism, culture, and topical cartoons.

Hate follows the life of Buddy Bradley, in a continuation of events from Bagge's strip "The Bradleys" from former publications Neat Stuff.   It is set for the first half in Seattle and later in suburban New Jersey.  Buddy has to deal with the end of adolescence, reluctantly growing up, his relationships with a host of unpleasant acquaintances he has to class as friends, working in dead-end jobs and having no direction in life.  Bagge used memories of events from his own life as material.

Hate has been referenced by many commentators as an important example of Generation X comic culture and grunge culture in general.  Bagge tends to see the parallels with the grunge lifestyle as largely coincidental, as he was referencing events that had happened to him ten years previous.  The comic was also released in Europe in the mid-'90s as Spanish, Italian and German language editions, the Spanish Odio proving particularly popular.

Publication history
First published by Fantagraphics from 1990 to 1998, it ran for 30 issues, and was one of the best-selling alternative comics.  The series continues in Hate Annual, (9) yearly collection of comics stories and articles that began in 2000.
A major story and format change took place in issue #16, when Buddy moved from Seattle back home to New Jersey, at which point the comic, once in black-and-white, changed to color. With issue #16, Bagge also started using an inker (rather unusual for an alternative comic book), Jim Blanchard.

Hates final five issues were 48-page anthologies, featuring a main Buddy Bradley story and then a series of short backup stories by cartoonists such as Rick Altergott, Dame Darcy, and Kevin Scalzo.

Characters

Main charactersBuddy Bradley Lisa Leavenworth, emotionally unstable, unconfident and sloppy, Lisa had a one-night stand with Buddy before the storyline of Hate began.  After Buddy's breakup with Valerie, Lisa became his long term girlfriend and moves back to Jersey with him. She bore his child and is currently his spouse.

Supporting characters
 Leonard "Stinky" Brown, an old friend of Buddy's from New Jersey who was his roommate in Seattle. Probably the most irresponsible, selfish and hopeless of all the characters.  Adopts an alternative lifestyle as a means to furthering his sexual conquests.
 George Cecil Hamilton III, Buddy's other roommate and über geek. Socially awkward, George hardly leaves his bedroom and immerses himself in science fiction and conspiracy theories.
 Valerie Russo, Buddy's first serious girlfriend, an upper middle class, apparently self-confident feminist with nymphomaniacal and manic depressive tendencies.
 Jay Spano, an old friend of Buddy's whom he met at a record store. He is a decade older than Buddy and uses heroin from time to time but claims not to be an addict. Buddy goes into business with Jay in collectables and later as scrap metal dealers.
 Jimmy Foley''', Buddy's next door neighbor in New Jersey, a small-time criminal serving out his probation for selling cocaine.
 Buddy's family

Cultural impact
Matthew J. Pustz has called Hate "The ultimate Generation X fable". Bagge managed to create archetypes with whom his audience identified strongly, which contributed to the popularity of the series.
There was a great deal of interaction between fans of Hate, Bagge and the characters. In Hate#3, Bagge ran a competition to "Win a Date With Stinky", to which many fans submitted artwork and photographs. Bagge included cartoon depictions of several of the entrants in the issues that followed.

In issue # 6, Bagge ran another contest, this time a "Buddy Bradley Look-Alike Contest" which hundreds entered. The winner was featured on the cover of issue 10. Bagge later wrote in an editorial that the winner had got in touch to tell him he was dating a woman named Valerie who was from Paris.

Peter Bagge played down the comics position in grunge culture, saying

In other mediaHate has been optioned as a movie or TV series numerous times, and in development as an animated series at MTV, HBO and Fox at various times since 1995. A pilot for an animated Hate series was made in 1995, directed by Steve Loter. It was animated by Rough Draft. The pilot wasn’t a success, and not much is known about it.

International versions

A Spanish language edition of Hate, translated to Odio (which means Hatred) was published by Ediciones La Cúpula starting in 1995.Before this Odio was serialised in Spanish magazine El Víbora. According to Gual Oscar and Jose A. Serrano, Odio, taking into account population difference was comparatively more successful in Spain than its USA counterpart (10,000 copies sold per issue in Spain compared to 30,000 copies per issue for the USA.).  Benet Roman writing for the 14th annual Barcelona BCN International Comics Fair commented that "Bagge ... knows how to capture some of the spirit of our time, using that most universal, affordable and difficult to produce medium: humor."

In Germany The first fifteen issues of Hate were translated for the German market and published by Carlsen Comics under the title Leck Mich! (literal: lick me!, possibly most closely translates to "kiss it!" as in kiss my ass).  Later color editions of Hate were issued in 1998 by Jochen Enterprises under the title Krass/Kraß (a slang term, meaning phat, cool or rad – its conventional meaning is crass).  It ran for seven issues before Jochen ceased trading.   Bagge sanctioned the creation of new Buddy stories for the German edition, by artists such as Philip Taegert and Guido Sieber.  Sieber moved the characters of Buddy and Lisa from Seattle to Berlin.

Collections

Trade paperbacks
 Hey Buddy! Volume I of The Complete Buddy Bradley Stories from Hate  Fantagraphics Books 978-1560971139. (Collects issues 1–5)
 Buddy The Dreamer: Volume II of the Complete Buddy Bradley Stories from Hate Fantagraphics Books 978-1560971559 (Collects issues 6–10)
 Fun With Buddy + Lisa: Volume III of the Complete Buddy Bradley Stories from Hate Fantagraphics Books 978-1560971764 (Collects issues 11–15)
 Buddy Go Home: Volume IV of the Complete Buddy Bradley Stories from Hate 1998, Fantagraphics Books 978-1560972761 (Collects issues 16–20)
 Buddy's Got Three Moms! Volume V of the Complete Buddy Bradley Stories from Hate Fantagraphics Books 1560973358 (Collects issues 21–25)
 Buddy Bites the Bullet! Volume VI of the Complete Buddy Bradley Stories from Hate Fantagraphics Books 978-1560974154 (Collects issues 26–30)Buddy Does Seattle: The Complete Buddy Bradley Stories from "Hate" Comics, Vol. I (1990–94) Fantagraphics Books (Collects Hate #1–15) 2005Buddy Does Jersey: The Complete Buddy Bradley Stories from "Hate" Comics, Vol. II (1994–1998) Fantagraphics Books (Collects Hate #16–30) 2007Buddy Buys a Dump: The Complete Buddy Bradley Stories from "Hate" Comics Vol. III (2000–2013) Fantagraphics Books (Collects Hate Annual'' #1–9) 2014

References

External links
 
 
 Essay on Hate from Toastyfrog.com

1990 comics debuts
Fantagraphics titles
Harvey Award winners for Best New Series
Punk comics
Humor comics
Satirical comics
Slice of life comics
Teen comedy comics
Culture of the Pacific Northwest
Comics set in Washington (state)
Comics set in New York City